In mathematics, Reidemeister torsion (or R-torsion, or Reidemeister–Franz torsion) is a topological invariant of manifolds introduced by Kurt Reidemeister  for 3-manifolds and generalized to higher dimensions by  and .

Reidemeister torsion was the first invariant in algebraic topology that could distinguish between closed manifolds which are homotopy equivalent but not homeomorphic, and can thus be seen as the birth of geometric topology as a distinct field. It can be used to classify lens spaces.

Reidemeister torsion is closely related to Whitehead torsion; see . It has also given some important motivation to arithmetic topology; see .

Definition of analytic torsion
If M is a Riemannian manifold and E a vector bundle over M, then there is a Laplacian operator acting on the k-forms with values in E. If the eigenvalues on k-forms are λj then the zeta function ζk is defined to be

for s large, and this is extended to all complex s by analytic continuation.
The zeta regularized determinant of the Laplacian acting on k-forms is

which is formally the product of the positive eigenvalues of the laplacian acting on k-forms.
The analytic torsion T(M,E) is defined to be

Definition of Reidemeister torsion

Let  be a finite connected CW-complex with fundamental group 
and universal cover , and let  be an orthogonal finite-dimensional -representation. Suppose that

for all n. Let  be any chain contraction of D*, i.e.  for all . We define the Reidemeister torsion

Let  be a compact smooth manifold, and let  be a unimodular representation.  has a smooth triangulation. For any choice of a volume , we get an invariant .

A short history of Reidemeister torsion

The classification includes examples of homotopy equivalent 3-dimensional manifolds which are not homeomorphic — at the time (1935) the classification was only up to PL homeomorphism, but later  showed that this was in fact a classification up to homeomorphism.

J. H. C. Whitehead defined the "torsion" of a homotopy equivalence between finite complexes. This is a direct generalization of the Reidemeister, Franz, and de Rham concept; but is a more delicate invariant. Whitehead torsion provides a key tool for the study of combinatorial or differentiable manifolds with nontrivial fundamental group and is closely related to the concept of "simple homotopy type", see 

For each q the Poincaré duality  induces

and then we obtain

The representation of the fundamental group of knot complement plays a central role in them. It gives the relation between knot theory and torsion invariants.

Cheeger–Müller theorem

As usual, we also obtain the Hodge Laplacian on p-forms 

Assuming that ,  the Laplacian is then a symmetric positive semi-positive elliptic operator with pure point spectrum

where  is the projection of  onto the kernel space  of the Laplacian .

As in the case of an orthogonal representation, we define the analytic torsion  by

In 1971 D.B. Ray and I.M. Singer conjectured that  for any unitary representation . Both approaches focus on the logarithm of torsions and their traces. This is easier for odd-dimensional manifolds than in the even-dimensional case, which involves additional technical difficulties. This Cheeger–Müller theorem (that the two notions of torsion are equivalent), along with Atiyah–Patodi–Singer theorem, later provided the basis for Chern–Simons perturbation theory.

A proof of the Cheeger-Müller theorem for arbitrary representations was later given by J. M. Bismut and Weiping Zhang. Their proof uses the Witten deformation.

References
 
 

 Online book

Differential geometry
3-manifolds
Surgery theory